Events from the year 1976 in Iran.

Incumbents
 Shah: Mohammad Reza Pahlavi 
 Prime Minister: Amir-Abbas Hoveida

Events

Births

 11 September – Masih Alinejad.

Deaths

 29 June – Hamid Ashraf.

See also
 Years in Iraq
 Years in Afghanistan

References

 
Iran
Years of the 20th century in Iran
1970s in Iran
Iran